ACGR may refer to:

 Acacia greggii, coded as ACGR by the US Department of Agriculture
 Annual compound growth rate
 Association Cantonale Genevoise de Rugby, Geneva
 Australian Competitive Grants Register, Department of Innovation, Industry, Science and Research
 Australian Corneal Graft Registry, Flinders University